Novomonoshkino is a rural locality (a selo) and the administrative center of Novomonoshkinsky Selsoviet, Zarinsky District, Altai Krai, Russia. The population was 1,045 as of 2013. There are 17 streets.

Geography 
Novomonoshkino is located 53 km northeast of Zarinsk (the district's administrative centre) by road. Khmelyovka is the nearest rural locality.

References 

Rural localities in Zarinsky District